Daniel Petru Pîslă (born 14 June 1986) is a Moldovan footballer who plays as a midfielder for Milsami Orhei in the Moldovan National Division.

Honours
FC Tiraspol
Divizia Națională Runner-up: 2013–14

References

External links
 
 
 
 
 

1986 births
Living people
Moldovan footballers
Moldova youth international footballers
Moldova under-21 international footballers
Moldova international footballers
Association football midfielders
Moldovan expatriate footballers
Expatriate footballers in Ukraine
Moldovan expatriate sportspeople in Ukraine
Expatriate footballers in Romania
Moldovan expatriate sportspeople in Romania
Expatriate footballers in Azerbaijan
Moldovan expatriate sportspeople in Azerbaijan
Footballers from Chișinău
FC Dynamo-2 Kyiv players
FC Vaslui players
FC Iskra-Stal players
FK Standard Sumgayit players
FK Mughan players
FC Academia Chișinău players
Turan-Tovuz IK players
FC Costuleni players
FC Tiraspol players
FC Veris Chișinău players
FC Zimbru Chișinău players
FC Dinamo-Auto Tiraspol players
Speranța Nisporeni players
CS Petrocub Hîncești players
FC Milsami Orhei players
Liga I players
Moldovan Super Liga players
Azerbaijan Premier League players